Whinney Hill is a village within the borough of Stockton-on-Tees and the ceremonial county of County Durham, England.

References

Villages in County Durham
Borough of Stockton-on-Tees
Places in the Tees Valley